Clement Hill may refer to:

People 

 Clem Hill (1877–1945), Australian cricketer
 Clement Hill (cricketer, born 1904) (1904–1988), Australian cricketer
 Clement Delves Hill (1781–1845), British Army officer of the Napoleonic era
 Clement S. Hill (1813–1892), U.S. Representative from Kentucky
  Sir Clement Lloyd Hill (1845-1913), British Member of Parliament for Shrewsbury, 1906–1913

Places
Clement Hill (Antarctica)
Clements Hills AVA, California wine region in San Joaquin County